Patrick Keith Sutton (12 February 1896 – 6 April 1973) was an Australian politician.

He was born at Portland to farmer John Patrick Sutton and Julia Minogue. Educated locally, he was a local journalist and was secretary of the Albert Park branch of the Labor Party from 1938. He married Mary Lucy McIntosh around 1924; they had two sons. From 1939 to 1952 he served on South Melbourne City Council (mayor 1943–44). In 1950 he was elected to the Victorian Legislative Assembly for Albert Park. He was elected Speaker in 1952 but lost the position when Labor lost government in 1955. He remained on the backbenches of parliament until 1970, when he retired. Sutton died at Middle Park in 1973.

References

1896 births
1973 deaths
Australian Labor Party members of the Parliament of Victoria
Members of the Victorian Legislative Assembly
Speakers of the Victorian Legislative Assembly
20th-century Australian politicians